The IBM 1712 Multiplexer and Terminal Unit was part of the IBM 1710 process control computer. The Terminal Unit provided the physical connections between factory wiring and the computer. The 1712 could support up to 300 separate wire pairs. Signal types supported included analog input, analog output, contact sense, contact operate, process branch indicators and process interrupts. Special terminal blocks supported thermocouple inputs. The Multiplexer would select which signal was connected to the IBM 1711 Data Converter.

1712